Kurbetcha (or Gurbetcha) is a creole language with what appears to be predominantly Domari language vocabulary and Cypriot Turkish grammar, spoken by the Gurbeti of Cyprus and North Cyprus. The Gurbetler have traditionally also spoken Cypriot Turkish. The Gurbetler of Ottoman Cyprus are of mixed ancestry. Muslim Dom people from Ottoman Syria settled there after Siege of Famagusta. The majority settled in the north after 1974. The language is not protected by the European Charter for Regional or Minority Languages, unlike Cypriot Maronite Arabic and Armenian.

Kurbetcha has been very little studied. A recent dissertation on its linguistics was done by Chryso Pelekani. Children are not learning the language; it has been supplanted by Turkish in the north and Greek in the south.

See also 
 Languages of Cyprus

References 

Languages of Cyprus
Romani in Cyprus